The men's 400 metre freestyle was a swimming event held as part of the swimming at the 1924 Summer Olympics programme. It was the fourth appearance of the event, which was established in 1908. The competition was held from Wednesday July 16, 1924 to Friday July 18, 1924.

Records
These were the standing world and Olympic records (in minutes) prior to the 1924 Summer Olympics.

In the first heat Ralph Breyer set a new Olympic record with 5:22.4 minutes, only to be bettered in the third heat by Johnny Weissmuller who set a time of 5:22.2 minutes. Weissmuller improved this record to 5:13.6 minutes in the semi-finals and finally to 5:04.2 minutes in the final.

Results

Heats

The fastest two in each heat and the fastest third-placed from across the heats advanced.

Heat 1

Heat 2

Heat 3

Heat 4

Heat 5

Semifinals

The fastest two in each semi-final and the faster of the two third-placed swimmer advanced to the final.

Semifinal 1

Semifinal 2

Final

References

External links
Olympic Report
 

Swimming at the 1924 Summer Olympics
Men's events at the 1924 Summer Olympics